Polemonium foliosissimum, the towering Jacob's-ladder, is a rare species of flowering plant in the phlox family Polemoniaceae, native to the western United States; Arizona, Colorado, Idaho, Nevada, New Mexico, Utah and Wyoming. As its synonym Polemonium archibaldiae it has gained the Royal Horticultural Society's Award of Garden Merit.

Subtaxa
The following varieties are accepted:
Polemonium foliosissimum var. alpinum Brand - Idaho, Nevada, Utah, Wyoming
Polemonium foliosissimum var. foliosissimum - Arizona, Colorado, New Mexico, Utah

References

foliosissimum
Endemic flora of the United States
Flora of Arizona
Flora of Colorado
Flora of Idaho
Flora of Nevada
Flora of New Mexico
Flora of Utah
Flora of Wyoming
Plants described in 1878
Flora without expected TNC conservation status